German submarine U-660 was a Type VIIC U-boat built for Nazi Germany's Kriegsmarine for service during World War II.
She was laid down on 15 February 1941 by Howaldtswerke, Hamburg as yard number 809, launched on 17 November 1941 and commissioned on 8 January 1942 under Oberleutnant zur See Götz Baur.

Design
German Type VIIC submarines were preceded by the shorter Type VIIB submarines. U-660 had a displacement of  when at the surface and  while submerged. She had two shafts and two  propellers.

U-660 was fitted with five  torpedo tubes (four fitted at the bow and one at the stern), fourteen torpedoes, one  SK C/35 naval gun, 220 rounds, and a  C/30 anti-aircraft gun. The boat had a complement of between forty-four and sixty.

Service history
The boat's career began with training at 5th U-boat Flotilla on 8 January 1942, followed by active service on 1 August 1942 as part of the 9th Flotilla. Later, on 1 November 1942, she transferred to operations in the Mediterranean with 29th Flotilla where she served for the remainder of her service.

Wolfpacks
U-660 took part in four wolfpacks, namely:
 Steinbrinck (6 – 11 August 1942)
 Lohs (11 – 28 August 1942)
 Tümmler (3 – 11 October 1942)
 Wal (10 – 12 November 1942)

Fate

Summary of raiding history

See also
 Mediterranean U-boat Campaign (World War II)
 Convoy SC 94

References

Bibliography

External links

German Type VIIC submarines
1941 ships
U-boats commissioned in 1942
U-boats sunk in 1942
U-boats sunk by depth charges
U-boats sunk by British warships
World War II shipwrecks in the Mediterranean Sea
World War II submarines of Germany
Ships built in Hamburg
Maritime incidents in November 1942